Cacia salomonum is a species of beetle in the family Cerambycidae. It was described by Per Olof Christopher Aurivillius in 1921 and is known from the Solomon Islands.

References

Cacia (beetle)
Beetles described in 1921